Scott Leon Guerrero  is a Guamanian footballer who plays as a defender for Quality Distributors.

References 

1990 births
Living people
Guamanian footballers
Guam international footballers
Quality Distributors players
People from Tamuning, Guam
Association football defenders